The Combat Assault Battalion was a mechanized battalion of the United States Marine Corps and subordinate element of the 3rd Marine Division and the III Marine Expeditionary Force. The unit was last based at Camp Schwab, Okinawa, Japan.

Mission
To conduct Amphibious Assault, Light Armored Reconnaissance and Combat Engineer operations across the Range of Military Operations (ROMO) in the Pacific Area of Responsibility (AOR) in support of MAGTF expeditionary operations.

Subordinate units
 Headquarters and Services Company
 Combat Engineer Company
 Light Armored Reconnaissance Company
 Assault Amphibian Vehicle Company

History

World War II
The 1st Amphibian Tractor Battalion was activated February 16, 1942 at New River, North Carolina as part of the 1st Marine Division.  The battalion relocated in May 1942 to Wellington, New Zealand and participated in the following World War II campaigns:
 Guadalcanal
 Finschhafen
 New Britain
 Peleliu
 Okinawa

The battalion was decommissioned on November 17, 1945 at Marine Corps Base Camp Pendleton, California.  Less than a year later that battalion was reactivated on May 1, 1946 at MCB Camp Pendleton

Korean War
The battalion participated in the Korean War from the Pusan Perimeter in operations from Inchon to Seoul, Chosin Reservoir, East to Central Front, and the Western Front. Following the war they participated in the defense of the Korean Demilitarized Zone from August 1953 to March 1955. They were relocated during March 1955 to Camp McGill, Japan.

Vietnam War
The battalion was reassigned March 16, 1965 to the 3d Marine Division and relocated to Camp Hansen, Okinawa.

Company A was deployed to South Vietnam on 7 May 1965 and was attached to the 4th Marine Regiment at Chu Lai Base Area. Company B deployed to South Vietnam on 8 July and was attached to the 9th Marine Regiment at Danang. On 16 July 1965 the remainder of the battalion loaded aboard  for deployment to South Vietnam, offloading at Red Beach Base Area on 21 July 1965.

The battalion engaged in combat operations from July 1965 through July 1969.

In April 1967 the battalion was moved to Cửa Việt Base and under the name Operation Napoleon together with the 1st Battalion, 3rd Marines was tasked with keeping waterways around the base open. Operation Napoleon/Saline concluded on 9 December 1968.

They relocated during July 1969 to Camp Schwab, Okinawa. On April 1, 1976 the battalion was re-designated as the 1st Tracked Vehicle Battalion with two companies of M60A1 (RISE Passive) Tanks and two companies of AAV-7's as well as 1 Company TOW.

1980s and 1990s
On November 10, 1988 the battalion was redesignated as the 1st Armored Assault Battalion. On September 30, 1992 it was redesignated as the Combat Support Group and finally became Combat Assault Battalion on October 5, 1994.

Deactivation
Combat Assault Battalion was deactivated October 12, 2018 with the Battalion assets divided between the rest of the 3d Marine Division. Most of the Battalion's assets including AAVs and LAV-25 mechanized vehicles were transferred to 4th Marine Regiment. The Battalion's Combat Engineer Company was be reallocated to other Marine units, including 3rd Marine Regiment and 1st Combat Engineer Battalion.

Unit awards
A unit citation or commendation is an award bestowed upon an organization for the action cited.  Members of the unit who participated in said actions are allowed to wear on their uniforms the appropriate ribbon of the awarded unit citation.  The Battalion's flag is decorated with the appropriate streamers.  Combat Assault Battalion, and those units for which it carries lineage and honors, was awarded the following:

See also
 List of United States Marine Corps battalions
 Organization of the United States Marine Corps

Notes

External links

 CAB's official site
 Combat Assault Battalion Facebook page

Armor battalions of the United States Marine Corps
Inactive units of the United States Marine Corps
Military units and formations established in 1942
Military units and formations disestablished in 2018